Ministry for Internal Affairs of Karachay-Cherkessia (Министерство внутренних дел по Карачаево-Черкесской Республике) is the main policing body in Karachay-Cherkessia.

Current Minister is Jaudat Yusupovich Akhmetkhanov (Since June 30, 2010).

Structure
Police (Полиция)
Detective Dept. (Управление уголовного розыска)
Anti-Terrorism (Центр по борьбе с экстремизмом)
Anti-Corruption (Управление экономической безопасности и противодействия коррупции)
Tax Crimes (Отдел по налоговым преступлениям)
Traffic Police (УГИБДД)
Investigations (Следственное управление)
Operations (Оперативно-розыскная часть собственной безопасности)
Inspection (Инспекция)
Spetsnaz (Центр профессиональной подготовки)
Information (Информационный центр)

External links
 Official Website
 Traffic Police of Karachay-Cherkessia

Politics of Karachay-Cherkessia
Karachay-Cherkessia
Karachay-Cherkessia